Netinho is a nickname. It may refer to:

 Netinho (singer) (born 1966), Ernesto de Souza Andrade Júnior, Brazilian singer and performer
 Netinho (footballer, born 1984), Artur Pereira Neto, Brazilian football attacking midfielder
 Netinho (footballer, born 1993), João Inácio de Jesus Cerqueira, Brazilian football midfielder